"We Getz Buzy" is the second single released from Illegal's debut album, The Untold Truth. It was written, produced and featured Erick Sermon. "We Getz Buzy" was the most successful of the three singles the group released during their brief existence, making it to 4 of the Billboard charts, including #1 on the Hot Rap Singles chart.

Single track listing

A-Side
"We Getz Buzy" (Radio Edit)- 3:40  
"We Getz Buzy" (TV Edit)- 3:40  
"We Getz Buzy" (Buzy Vibe Mix)- 3:40

B-Side
"We Getz Buzy" (Rowdy Main Mix)- 3:40  
"We Getz Buzy" (Alternate Vocal Mix)- 3:40  
"We Getz Buzy" (Jeep Vibe Mix)- 5:50

Charts

1993 singles
1993 songs
Illegal (group) songs
Songs written by Erick Sermon
Rowdy Records singles
Songs written by Jamal (rapper)